Bebearia discors is a butterfly in the family Nymphalidae. It is found in Cameroon and the Democratic Republic of the Congo (Uele and Sankuru).

References

Butterflies described in 1994
discors